James Edward Bailey (1944 – 9 May 2001), generally known as Jay Bailey, was an American pioneer of biochemical engineering, particularly metabolic engineering.  He was said to be "the most influential biochemical engineer of modern times".  In a special issue of a journal dedicated to his work, the editor said "Jay was one of biochemical engineering’s most creative thinkers and spirited advocates, a true innovator who played an enormous role in establishing biochemical engineering as the dynamic discipline it is today". His numerous contributions in biotechnology and metabolic engineering have led to multiple awards including the First Merck Award in Metabolic Engineering.

He is commemorated in the James E. Bailey Award for Outstanding Contributions to the Field of Biological Engineering, by the AIChE Society for Biological Engineering.

Life
Bailey was the only child of Jim and Doris Bailey, growing up in Rockford, Illinois. He studied chemical engineering at Rice University receiving a BA in 1966 and PhD in 1969 working with Fritz Horn.  He worked for Shell then taught chemical engineering at the University of Houston starting in 1971 before moving to Caltech in 1980 before becoming Professor of Biotechnology at the Swiss Federal Institute of Technology (ETH) in Zurich in 1992. Jay died of cancer 9 May 2001.

He was married to fellow chemical engineer Frances Arnold and had two sons, James and Sean Bailey.

References

Further reading
Biotechnology and Bioengineering (2002) Vol 79 issue 5: Special Issue: A Tribute to Jay Bailey (Wiley Interscience)  Contains reprints of 6 important papers by Jay Bailey selected by the editors.
Vassily Hatzimanikatis & James C. Liao (2002) Biotechnology and Bioengineering vol 79 no 5, pp 504–508  "A Memorial Review of Jay Bailey’s Contribution in Prokaryotic Metabolic Engineering" 
K. F. Reardon et al. (2002) Biotechnology and Bioengineering vol 79 no 5, pp 484–489 "Jay Bailey as a Mentor - The Students' Perspective" 
J. E. Bailey & D. F. Ollis (1986) Biochemical Engineering Fundamentals 2nd ed., McGraw-Hill, 
J. E. Bailey (2001) Nature Biotechnology 19 503-504 "Complex biology with no parameters" (published just after his death)

American chemical engineers
Academic staff of ETH Zurich
Rice University alumni
University of Houston faculty
California Institute of Technology faculty
1944 births
2001 deaths
20th-century American engineers